A panalphabetic window is a stretch of text that contains all the letters of the alphabet in order.  It is a special type of pangram or pangrammatic window.

Natural-sounding panalphabetic sentences are not particularly difficult to construct; the following sequence of 132 letters by Howard Bergerson is often quoted:

Considerably rarer are short, naturally occurring panalphabetic windows.  Based on the letter frequency distribution of a large corpus, Mike Keith calculated the expected window size for English text to be around 3000 letters. His computer-assisted search of Project Gutenberg identified the shortest natural panalphabetic window as a 535-letter passage from The Alkahest, a translation of Honoré de Balzac's La Recherche de l'Absolu:

See also
Pangram
Pangrammatic window

References

Pangrams